Ibrahim Hassan Hussein (born 10 August 1966) is an Egyptian former professional football player who played as a right back. Ibrahim Hassan has well over 100 caps for Egypt. His twin brother Hossam also played professional football, and they shared clubs for most of their extensive careers.

Club career
Born in Cairo, Hassan played professionally for almost twenty years, in a career in which he shared teams with his sibling Hossam for its vast majority. He represented Al Ahly (twice), PAOK FC, Neuchâtel Xamax, Al Ain SCC, Zamalek SC and Al-Masry, even joining his twin in his abroad spells in Greece, Switzerland and United Arab Emirates.

Hassan retired at almost 40 years of age, going on to have a spell as assistant manager in former team El-Masry, where his brother would also start his coaching career in 2008. In 2010, after a brief spell as assistant manager with Zamalek, he became the club's director of football.

International career
Hassan played 125 games and scored 12 goals for Egypt for almost 20 years, as Hossam. He appeared for the national team at the 1990 FIFA World Cup, helping it to two draws and a narrow 0–1 defeat against England.  His brother was also an undisputed starter, as the pair became the first players from Africa to be selected to FIFA's Century Club. Hassan remains the only Egyptian footballer who made the FIFA world team selection (three times) and played in 1990 and 1999 against Bosnia and South Africa respectively.

Career statistics

International

Honours

Club
Egyptian League (14): 1984–85, 1985–86, 1986–87, 1988–89, 1993–94, 1994–95, 1995–96, 1996–97, 1997–98, 1998–99, 1999–2000, 2000–01, 2002–03, 2003–04
Egyptian Cup (5): 1984–85, 1988–89, 1992–93, 1995–96, 2001–02
Egyptian Super Cup (2): 2001, 2002
African Cup Winners' Cup (4): 1983–84, 1984–85, 1985–86, 1992–93
African Champions League (2): 1986–87, 2001–02
Arab Champions League: 1995–96
Arab Cup Winners' Cup: 1993–94
Arab Super Cup: 1997, 1998
 Afro-Asian Cup: 1988
African Super Cup: 2002
Arab Champions League: 2002–03
Saudi-Egyptian Super Cup: 2003
UAE League: 1999–2000

International
Egypt
Arab Nations Cup: 1992

See also
List of men's footballers with 100 or more international caps

References

External links

1966 births
Living people
Egyptian twins
Footballers from Cairo
Twin sportspeople
Egyptian footballers
Association football defenders
Al Ahly SC players
Zamalek SC players
Al Masry SC players
Super League Greece players
PAOK FC players
Swiss Super League players
Neuchâtel Xamax FCS players
Al Ain FC players
Egypt international footballers
1990 FIFA World Cup players
1999 FIFA Confederations Cup players
1988 African Cup of Nations players
1992 African Cup of Nations players
2000 African Cup of Nations players
Egyptian expatriate footballers
Egyptian expatriate sportspeople in Switzerland
Expatriate footballers in Switzerland
Expatriate footballers in Greece
Expatriate footballers in the United Arab Emirates
FIFA Century Club
Egyptian Premier League players
UAE Pro League players
Egyptian expatriate sportspeople in Greece
Egyptian expatriate sportspeople in the United Arab Emirates